Kilchoman distillery (pronounced Kil-ho-man) is a distillery that produces single malt Scotch whisky on Islay, an island of the Inner Hebrides. Kilchoman Distillery is in the northwest of the island, close to Machir Bay. Kilchoman was founded by Anthony Wills and remains an independent, family run distillery. It is the smallest on the island but since obtaining Rockside Farm in 2015, is in the process of expanding.

History

The distillery began production in December 2005, and was the first to be built on Islay since 1908. The distillery uses barley grown on site at Rockside Farm and malted at the distillery, as well as malt from the Port Ellen maltings and releases separate bottlings depending on the source of the grain. It is one of six Scottish distilleries still working with traditional floor-maltings, and is unique in completing all parts of the whisky making process – growing barley, malting, distilling, maturing and bottling – on Islay.

The distillery first filled casks on 14 December 2005 and the distillery began bottling 3-year-old single malt in September 2009. The first Kilchoman, the "Inaugural release" was released in 2009 and the first 100% Islay whisky released in 2011.

The whisky produced by the Port Ellen maltings are peated to the same levels as Ardbeg 50 ppm, while the malt peated on their own floor maltings will be approximately 20 ppm.

Bottlings
Kilchoman releases several bottlings. 
 Machir Bay, 46% ABV
 Loch Gorm, 46% ABV
 Sanaig, 46% ABV, originally released for the French market – launched worldwide in 2016
 100% Islay, 50% ABV – this is the grain-to-glass offering from Kilchoman

References

External links 
 

Distilleries in Scotland
2005 establishments in Scotland
Food and drink companies established in 2005
Whisky distilleries in Islay